The House by the Side of the Road is a historic house at 61 School Street in Tilton, New Hampshire.  The house, built c. 1783, is a modest -story Cape style house that is five bays wide, with a center entry and a central chimney.  The house is locally notable as the home of poet Sam Walter Foss in 1877–78, when he was attending Tilton Seminary, and has been known as the "House by the Side of Road" after Foss's poem of the same name, since the 1890s.  The house was listed on the National Register of Historic Places in 1980.

Description and history
The House by the Side of the Road is located a short way north of the Tilton School, on the east side of School Street opposite some of the school's athletic fields.  It is set on a small wooded parcel.  It is a -story wood-frame structure, with a side-gable roof, off-center brick chimney, and clapboarded exterior.  The chimney is one of two the house once had, and is covered by a corbelled cap.  The street-facing front facade is five bays wide, with the main entrance at the center, flanked by sidelight windows.  The other windows are rectangular six-over-six sash, framed by simple corner boards.  The house is not architecturally distinguished, and is typical of late 18th-century residential construction in rural New Hampshire.

The house was built about 1783, and is a well-preserved example of period vernacular architecture.  It is most noted for its literary association with the poet Sam Walter Foss, who lived here in 1877–78, while attending the Tilton School (then known as Tilton Seminary).

See also
National Register of Historic Places listings in Belknap County, New Hampshire

References

Houses on the National Register of Historic Places in New Hampshire
Houses completed in 1783
Houses in Belknap County, New Hampshire
National Register of Historic Places in Belknap County, New Hampshire
Tilton, New Hampshire